Koreasat 5 (also known as ANASIS-I (Army Navy Air Force Satellite Information System-I) and Mugunghwa 5 (무궁화 5호)) is a South Korean communications satellite operated by Koreasat.

See also 

Korea Aerospace Research Institute (KARI)

Communications satellites in geostationary orbit
Satellites of South Korea
Spacecraft launched in 2006
2006 in spaceflight
2006 in South Korea
Satellites using the Spacebus bus
Spacecraft launched by Zenit and Energia rockets